Jim Shum (1853–1914) was a notable New Zealand goldminer. He was born in Guangdong Province, China in 1853.

References

1853 births
1914 deaths
New Zealand gold prospectors
People from Panyu District
Chinese emigrants to New Zealand
People of the Otago Gold Rush